BNS Sheikh Mujib  is a full-fledged naval base of the Bangladeshi Navy in Dhaka of Bangladesh. It is one of largest bases in Dhaka of Bangladesh Navy.

History
With the aim of Bangladesh Armed Forces Goal 2030 Bangladesh Navy is continuing to enhance its capabilities by establishing new bases to support the force in large extent especially logistics and information technological support in capital. To full fill the agenda Prime Minister Sheikh Hasina commissioned this full-fledged naval base on November 5, 2018, to be called BNS Sheikh Mujib. Bangladesh Navy treat this installation as crucial to cater the operational needs of the force in the capital.

Functions
The main objective of this naval base is to coordinate disaster response services alongside running their naval information technology programme and naval intelligence training and operating helicopters of the force. Navy helicopters are stationed and maintained as well in this floated base.

See also
List of ships of the Bangladesh Navy

References

Bangladesh Navy bases
Shore establishments of the Bangladesh Navy